What You Need is the tenth studio album by American contemporary R&B singer Stacy Lattisaw, released October 17, 1989 via Motown Records. It did not chart on the Billboard 200, but it peaked at #16 on the Billboard R&B chart. It was also Lattisaw's final album before she retired from the music industry.

Four singles were released from the album: "What You Need", "Where Do We Go from Here", "Dance for You" and "I Don't Have the Heart". "Where Do We Go from Here" was the most successful single from the album, peaking at #1 on the Billboard R&B singles chart in 1990.

Track listing

Charts

Weekly charts

Year-end charts

Notes

References

External links
 
 

1989 albums
Stacy Lattisaw albums
Albums produced by Timmy Regisford
Motown albums